This is a list of mayors of Peachtree City, Georgia, United States.

The current Mayor of Peachtree City, and 12th person to be mayor, is Kim Learnard.

List of mayors
The following is a list of the mayors of Peachtree City and their respective terms.

Mayoral elections
The following is a list of the dates, candidates, and results of Peachtree City's mayoral elections. (Winners are in bold.)

References

Meet the mayors who led Peachtree City through 50 years
Elections 2009
Elections 2013
Elections 2017

Peachtree City, Georgia
Fayette County, Georgia